The Liberal Federation was a South Australian political party from 16 October 1923 to 1932. It came into existence as a merger between the rival Liberal Union and National Party, to oppose Labor.

Encouraged by the overwhelming success of the Emergency Committee of South Australia at the 1931 federal election, the Liberal Federation merged with the Country Party to form the South Australian Liberal and Country League in 1932, again with overwhelming success at the 1933 state election.

Parliamentary leaders
Henry Barwell (1923–1925)
Richard Layton Butler (1925–1932)

See also
Members of the South Australian House of Assembly, 1921–1924
Members of the South Australian House of Assembly, 1924–1927
Members of the South Australian House of Assembly, 1927–1930
Members of the South Australian House of Assembly, 1930–1933
Members of the South Australian Legislative Council, 1921–1924
Members of the South Australian Legislative Council, 1924–1927
Members of the South Australian Legislative Council, 1927–1930
Members of the South Australian Legislative Council, 1930–1933

References

Defunct liberal political parties
Defunct political parties in South Australia
Political party alliances in Australia
Liberal Party of Australia
National Party of Australia
1923 establishments in Australia
Political parties established in 1923
1932 disestablishments in Australia
Political parties disestablished in 1932